ET Andromedae is a binary star system star in the northern constellation of Andromeda. It has an apparent visual magnitude of 6.48, placing it at the nominal limit for visibility with the naked eye.

Variations in the radial velocity of this star suggest it is a single-lined spectroscopic binary system. This yields orbital elements with a period of 48.3 days and an eccentricity of 0.50.

The SiSr notation indicates unusual abundances of silicon and strontium in the spectrum. The abundance of silicon varies depending on the viewing angle. The star is an Alpha2 Canum Venaticorum variable with a period of 1.618875 days.

References

A-type main-sequence stars
Alpha2 Canum Venaticorum variables
Spectroscopic binaries
Andromeda (constellation)
Durchmusterung objects
219749
115036
8861
Andromedae, ET